Simon Hočevar (born 27 February 1974 in Ljubljana) is a Slovenian slalom canoeist who competed at the international level from 1990 to 2012.

Hočevar won three medals in the C1 team event at the ICF Canoe Slalom World Championships with a gold (1993) and two bronzes (1997, 2002). He also won three medals at the European Championships (1 gold and 2 bronzes).

Hočevar competed in three Summer Olympics, earning his best finish of sixth in the C1 event in Athens in 2004.

World Cup individual podiums

References

1974 births
Canoeists at the 1996 Summer Olympics
Canoeists at the 2000 Summer Olympics
Canoeists at the 2004 Summer Olympics
Living people
Olympic canoeists of Slovenia
Slovenian male canoeists
Sportspeople from Ljubljana
Medalists at the ICF Canoe Slalom World Championships